In enzymology, a cytochrome-c3 hydrogenase is an enzyme that catalyzes the chemical reaction

2 H2 + ferricytochrome c3  4 H+ + ferrocytochrome c3

Thus, the two substrates of this enzyme are H2 and ferricytochrome c3, whereas its two products are H+ and ferrocytochrome c3.

This enzyme belongs to the family of oxidoreductases, specifically those acting on hydrogen as donor with a cytochrome as acceptor.  The systematic name of this enzyme class is hydrogen:ferricytochrome-c3 oxidoreductase. Other names in common use include H2:ferricytochrome c3 oxidoreductase, cytochrome c3 reductase, cytochrome hydrogenase, and hydrogenase [ambiguous].  It has 3 cofactors: iron, Nickel,  and Iron-sulfur.

Structural studies

References

 
 
 
 
 
 

EC 1.12.2
Iron enzymes
Nickel enzymes
Iron-sulfur enzymes
Enzymes of known structure